Gilles Lipovetsky (born 1944) is a French philosopher, writer, and sociologist.

Lipovetsky may also refer to: 

 Mark Lipovetsky (born 1964), Russian literary, film, and cultural critic 
 16861 Lipovetsky, an asteroid